Shetland's Young Fiddler of the Year is an annual competition held over two days organised by the Shetland Folk Society.

It is open to fiddle players 16 or under from Shetland with around 80 entrants each year. The most entries ever received were 110 in 2014.
There are two main categories, 'Open' encompassing all styles and 'Traditional' focussing on the traditional Shetland style. The categories have junior, intermediate and senior sections.

Previous winners
Previous winners of the main 'Open' section include:

Yelena Anderson (2022)
Magnus Williamson (2021,aged 15)
Ashley Hay (2019, aged 13)
Emma Leask (2018, aged 14)
George Spence (2017)
Jodie Smith (2016, aged 13)
Bryden Priest (2015, aged 15)
Sophie Moar (2014, aged 16) 
Callum Watt (2013, aged 15)
Laura Smith (2012, aged 14)
Hannah Adamson (2011, aged 13)
Liza Fullerton (2010, aged 15)
Chapman Cheng (2009)
Maggie Adamson (2008, aged 16)
Miriam Brett (2007)
Ryan Couper (2006)
Mary Rutherford (2005) Member of Kollifirbolli
Lyn Anderson (2004)
Laura Lockyer (2003)
Gemma Donald (2002)
Lois Nicol (2001) Member of Fullsceilidh Spelemannslag
Vaila Tait (2000)
Mark Laurenson (1999, aged 14) Member of Fullsceilidh Spelemannslag
Alexander Hutchison (1998)
Bethany Reid (1997)
Andrew Gifford (1996) Member of Fiddlers' Bid
Jenna Reid (1995, aged 14) Solo performer and member of Filska and Dochas
Stuart Grains (1994) Member of Fullsceilidh Spelemannslag
Magnus Johnson (1993)
Bryan Gear (1992)
Chris Stout (1991) Solo performer, composer, session musician and member of Fiddlers' Bid
David Keith (1990)
Jenny Napier (1989)
Peter Gear (1988) Now with Bongshang
Andrew Deyell (1987)
Emma Johnson (1986) Previously with Rock, Salt & Nails and Shetland's Young Heritage)
Jeanna Johnson (1985) Previously with Shetland's Young Heritage
Jacqueline Sinclair (1984)
Catriona MacDonald (1983) Academic, solo performer and member of Blazin' Fiddles. Previously with Shetland's Young Heritage)
Margaret Robertson (1982)

References
Information gleaned from Shetland-Music website Shetland-Music

Shetland fiddlers
Scottish awards
1982 establishments in Scotland
British music awards
Awards established in 1982